Simon Stephen Shepherd (born 20 August 1956) is an English actor best known to TV audiences from many appearances, including as Dr Will Preston in eight series of ITV's Peak Practice and Doctor Jonathan Barling in Casualty.

Shepherd was born in Bristol. He went to school at Clifton College in Bristol and was a contemporary of the director Roger Michell in Brown's House. He subsequently attended Manchester Metropolitan University and Bristol Old Vic Theatre School and was a member of the National Youth Theatre.

As well as his television appearances, such as playing Patrick Simmons in the 1984 Miss Marple adaptation 'A Murder is Announced', he has had many notable stage and film roles since 1980, including as Lord Ashbrook in the 2011 Bristol Old Vic production of Helen Edmundson's Coram Boy.

In popular culture
Simon Shepherd was regularly mentioned in the BBC comedy Gimme Gimme Gimme as Tom's crush and appeared as himself in an episode of each series.

He played Patrick Simmons in the 1984 Miss Marple TV-adaptation of A Murder is Announced. In 1989 he appeared in Henry V and in 1990 in Chancer. He played Edgar Linton in the 1992 Wuthering Heights. In 1993 he appeared in Poirot “Jewel Robbery at the Grand Metropolitan” as Andrew Hall and in Peak Practice. In 1999 he appeared in Catherine Cookson’s “Tilly Trotter” and Rogue Trader. In 2008 he appeared in Agatha Christie’s Poirot “Mrs McGinty’s Dead” as Dr. Rendell. He appeared in the 2022 Midsomer Murders “The Scarecrow Murders”. He played Chief Inspector Dermott Craddock in the 2019 “The Mirror Crack’d” (stage play).   

On 16 February 2011 Simon Shepherd guest-starred in the 2000th episode of the BBC TV Drama Doctors.

He played the role of Sir Norman Cavendish in the play The Duck House by Dan Patterson and Colin Swash, starring alongside Ben Miller and Diana Vickers. The show is a political farce based on the UK parliamentary expenses scandal of 2009 and played a five-week tour in October 2013 before transferring to London's Vaudeville Theatre through spring 2014.

In 2017 he appeared in the BBC series Father Brown as Edward Reese in episode 5.11 "The Sins of Others".

On 25 March 2017 he starred in BBC1's Casualty as Dr. Jonathan Barling in the episode 'Five Days.' He reprised the role on 4 August 2018.

Personal life
He married the costume designer Alexandra Byrne in 1980 and they have four children. Shepherd supports several charities, especially those involving the well-being of children (Barnardo's, Tearfund BOPS and Save the Children).

References

External links

Living people
1956 births
Male actors from Bristol
People educated at Clifton College
Alumni of Manchester Metropolitan University
English male television actors
English male musical theatre actors
English male Shakespearean actors
English male stage actors
National Youth Theatre members